Jaegyu Knoll is an undersea knoll (a submarine volcano)  northwest of Rosamel Island in the Antarctic Sound. It rises c.  above the sea floor to c.  below sea level. It was first mapped by swath bathymetry during a United States Antarctic Program cruise by Nathaniel B. Palmer, in January 2007 (Eugene Domack, chief scientist; M. Terminal, ship's master). Named by the US-Advisory Committee for Undersea Features in 2007 after Jeon Jaegyu, a young scientist at King Sejong Station on King George Island, with the Korean Antarctic Program during the 2003 field season. He participated in a rescue attempt for an overturned boat in Maxwell Bay but was himself thrown into the sea by heavy seas, and succumbed to hypothermia while making his way along the shore toward Marsh Station.

References

Volcanoes of the Southern Ocean